Robert C. Randall (1948 – June 2, 2001) was an American advocate for medical marijuana and the founder of Alliance for Cannabis Therapeutics.

Life and activism 
Robert Randall was the first legal medical marijuana smoker in the United States since 1937. Randall successfully used a medical necessity defense when he was charged with illegal possession of cannabis to treat his glaucoma. The case, United States v. Randall, is "The first successful articulation of the medical necessity defense in the history of the common law, and indeed, the first case to extend the necessity defense to the crimes of possession or cultivation of marijuana".

Writings 
Randall, who wrote Marijuana & AIDS: Pot, Politics, and PWAs in America, also documented his accounts in his book, co-written with his wife Alice O'Leary: Marijuana Rx: The Patients' Fight for Medical Pot, .

See also

Compassionate Investigational New Drug program

References

External links
 High in America by Patrick Anderson (chapter on Robert Randall)
 Robert Randall at the Drug Policy Forum of Wisconsin
 The New York Times obituary

1948 births
2001 deaths
American cannabis activists